The 1904–05 Northern Football League season was the sixteenth in the history of the Northern Football League, a football competition in Northern England.

Clubs

The league featured 13 clubs which competed in the last season, no new clubs joined the league this season.

League table

References

1904-05
1904–05 in English association football leagues